Oepping is a municipality in the district of Rohrbach in the Austrian state of Upper Austria.

Geography
Oepping lies in the Mühlviertel. About 24 percent of the municipality is forest, and 70 percent is farmland.

References

Cities and towns in Rohrbach District